Thrikkovilvattom  is a panchayat in Kollam district in the state of Kerala, India. It is situated 9km east of Kollam City.

Demographics
 India census, Thrikkovilvattom had a population of 36764 with 18125 males and 18639 females.

Places of interest
[Mukhathala temple]Murari Temple is very famous place of worship here. The last uthsavam(festival) of a Malayalam year in the entire kerala takes place here.

References

Villages in Kollam district